Xenocracy is a space simulator developed by Simis Limited and published by Grolier Interactive in 1998. Xenocracy is a cross between a space combat action sim and a political strategy game.

Story
The year is 10 600 of the Common Era. Mankind has colonised space, founding a Solar dominion on the power and wealth created by the mineral lycosite. Four great planetary superpowers - Earth, Mars, Venus and Mercury - wage a covert war for the outer colonies and their rich reserves of lycosite. Only the peacekeepers of the United Planet Nations can prevent these skirmishes and raids from erupting into all-out Solar War. You are the WingToucher commanding the elite U.P.N.

Gameplay
In the far future, four planetary superpowers (the Earth Dominion, the Mercury League, the Venus Alliance and the Mars Combine) are vying for control of the solar system and on the brink of all-out "thermostellar war". As commander of the United Planet Nations peacekeeping fighter squadron, your role is to maintain the balance and prevent cold war and localized conflicts from escalating into open interplanetary hostilities. Further complicating the matter, you must deal with pirates and a looming alien threat.

As each planetary superpower launches low-intensity strikes (as opposed to open warfare) against the colonies and outposts of the other three, you are presented with the choice, via a strategic solar system map showing flaring geopolitical hotspots, of which to aid. If you aid one superpower too much at the expense of the others, as one is first tempted to do, you upset the balance and cause the war you sought to prevent. Whichever you choose, afterward you are realistically presented with complaints and political propaganda from the other three superpowers, and receive news broadcasts concerning the interplanetary geopolitical wrangling.

In addition to keeping the peace, you also manage research and development of newer and more powerful technologies, which will eventually prove crucial. Several fighter and weapon types are available, and the scenery varies from asteroid belts and dust clouds to planetary surfaces. You may choose from several wingmen, each with a personal description and personality type, whom you must do your best to keep alive. Missions include such tasks as defending mine complexes from attack (or attacking them) and protecting convoys (or destroying them).

Multiplayer
The game allows multiplayer up to 8 players over TCP/IP or serial connections.

References

1998 video games
Grolier Interactive games
Multiplayer and single-player video games
PlayStation (console) games
Science fiction video games
Shooter video games
Video games developed in the United Kingdom
Windows games